This was the second edition of the tournament in the 2021 tennis season. Denys Molchanov and Aleksandr Nedovyesov were the defending champions but only Nedovyesov chose to defend his title, partnering Viktor Troicki. Nedovyesov lost in the semifinals to Nathan Pasha and Max Schnur.

Nathaniel Lammons and Jackson Withrow won the title after defeating Pasha and Schnur 6–4, 6–2 in the final.

Seeds

Draw

References

External links
 Main draw

Nur-Sultan Challenger II - Doubles